There are multiple articles on churches known as Wesley Uniting Church:

 Wesley Uniting Church, Broken Hill
 Wesley Uniting Church, Toowoomba